Maqbul Mohammed (born 7 March 1981) is a Kenyan actor and radio presenter. He is known for his role (Donavan) in both Auntie Boss and Vashita, Kenya's first interlinked comedy series both produced by Moonbeam productions.  He also featured in Kenya's first ever crime and legal drama Crime and Justice. Maqbul's fame as an actor skyrocketed when he featured in the Kenya'sMakutano Junction, which was one of the longest running village setup TV Series from 2005 to 2009. 
Maqbul's latest film project was crime and justice which was aired on Showmax. He has also acted in other projects like lies that bind.

Early life
Born in Mombasa on 7 March 1981, Maqbul is brother to actress, Shadya Delgush.

Personal life
He is a father of three.

Career
Maqbul joined theater immediately after secondary school at the phoenix theaters in 1999 Horning his skills on stage for the next 4 years featuring in numerous plays which would earn him a tv call up at the Kenya Broadcasting Corporation.
 
Maqbul has featured in numerous television series and films. His major breakthrough to the entertainment industry was in 2006 for his role as Karis in series Makutano Junction. He would later star and feature in many tv shows like Auntie Boss, Vashita and Crime and Justice
He has subsequently appeared in a number of films such as; Behind Closed Doors,  Kwani Readings Weakness,  All Girls Together,.

He first appeared on TV as a teenager in the KBC TV drama Reflections.
In 2011, he was cast as one of the main characters in the award-winning soap opera Lies that Bind. He shared credits with Ruth Maingi, Maureen Koech, Justine Mirichii and Florence Nduta. Due to his great performance in the project, he was nominated in the 2013 Kalasha Awards.
In 2015, he had a leading role in comedy Auntie Boss! alongside  Eve D'Souza.
Apart from acting, Maqbul was a radio presenter in Capital FM and recently Headed Radio department at Nation Fm and Managing director at NRG media groups.

Filmography
 Film

 Television

References

External links

Kenyan male television actors
Living people
Kenyan male film actors
1981 births
20th-century Kenyan male actors
21st-century Kenyan male actors
People from Mombasa